FC Prykarpattia Ivano-Frankivsk is a professional Ukrainian football from Ivano-Frankivsk. The club competes in the Ukrainian First League. The club has been reformed based on FC Teplovyk Ivano-Frankivsk that existed since 1998.

 FC Spartak Ivano-Frankivsk (1981-2003)
 FSC Prykarpattia Ivano-Frankivsk (2007-2012, previously Fakel)

Overview

Names
 1998–2013 Teplovyk
 2013–2014 Nika-Teplovyk
 2014–2016 Teplovyk
 2016–2017 Teplovyk-Prykarpattia
 2017–present Prykarpattia

History
The football club Teplovyk traces its founding roots to 1998 as a factory team of the State City Company "Ivano-Frankivsk Teplokomunenerho" (IFTKE). "Ivano-Frankivsk Teplokomunenerho" is an abbreviation for Ivano-Frankivsk community energy and utility.

At first the new football club was taking part in competitions among teams of utility companies of Ivano-Frankivsk, the region (Ivano-Frankivsk Oblast) as well as other mini-football tournaments.

During the two seasons, 1998 and 1999, the team competed in the regional championship under the auspice of the "Ukraine" fitness and sports society regional council and twice became a champion of this competition.

In 2000, the club entered the Ivano-Frankivsk Oblast championship at its top tier.

In 2002, the club won the Ivano-Frankivsk Oblast championship under the guidance of Vasyl Humenyaka.

In 2013, Teplovyk merged with a local youth football club Nika changed its name to Municipal Football Club Nika-Teplovyk.

Before the 2014 season, Nika-Teplovyk went bankrupt and separated, with Nika remaining in the Oblast Premier League, while Teplovyk for the 2014 season had to restart from the second league (second tier) with a help from another local company "Yutim".

In 2015, the team competed in competitions of the regional top tier. The senior team finished 6th place, while the youth team in parallel competitions won the championship.

In 2016 Teplovyk entered the Ukrainian Football Amateur League where in a group phase it placed 4th out of 4. Nonetheless, in the beginning the club applied for the Second League and its application was approved. At the same time at the Ivano-Frankivsk Oblast championship top tier continued to compete the club's reserve Teplovyk-DYuSSh-3 where it continues to play.

The club entered the 2016–17 Ukrainian Second League gaining the professional status. The club also adopted a new logo with the year of 2016 inscribed on it. 

On 5 December 2016, the administration of the club applied to have its name to be changed to Teplovyk-Prykarpattia for the spring portion of the competition, while at the same time have its name changed again to Prykarpattia for the 2017–18 season. The club's administration also adopted a new logo with a year of 1981 inscribed on it when the original Spartak Ivano-Frankivsk changed to Prykarpattia.

In 2018 Prykarpattia's reserve team, Teplovyk-DYuSSh-3, competing at the Ivano-Frankivsk Oblast competitions changed its name to Prykarpattia-Teplovyk.

On 17 April 2022, during the 2021–22 Ukrainian First League season and amidst the 2022 Russian invasion of Ukraine, 14 Prykarpattia players and coaches joined the Armed Forces of Ukraine.

Honors
Regional championship (Ivano-Frankivsk Oblast Football Federation)
Winners (1): 2002
Runners up (4):  2003, 2005, 2006, 2010 
Regional cup competition (Ivano-Frankivsk Oblast Football Federation)
Winners (2): 2003, 2004
Finalists (1): 2010
Regional Super Cup (Ivano-Frankivsk Oblast Football Federation)
Winners (1): 2003

Stadium
In 2000, the club played at the neglected city stadium Lokomotyv, which is one of the oldest in the city (opened in 1927). The club's owners reconstructed the stadium, added mounted electronic scoreboards and installed plastic seats to the central stand. The upgraded stadium was renamed as Stadion Hirka, which is the name for the location of the neighborhood where it is located. It has a seating capacity of 342 individual seats. At that time Volodymyr Roshnivskyi was both the director of the sports facility and the chairman of the club.

Players

Team squad

Out on loan

Presidents
 ????–???? Volodymyr Roshnivskyi
 ????–2013 Mykola Vasylkiv
 2013–2014 Andriy Shuliatytskyi (a nephew of Yuriy Shulyatytskyi)
 2014–2016 Volodymyr Roshnivskyi
 2016–present Vasyl Olshanetskyi

League and cup history

{|class="wikitable"
|-bgcolor="#efefef"
! Season
! Div.
! Pos.
! Pl.
! W
! D
! L
! GS
! GA
! P
!Cup
!colspan=2|Europe
!Notes
|-bgcolor=SteelBlue
|align=center|2003
|align=center|4th
|align=center|5
|align=center|8 	
|align=center|2 	
|align=center|3 	
|align=center|3 	
|align=center|7 	
|align=center|6 	
|align=center|9
|align=center|
|align=center|
|align=center|
|align=center|
|-bgcolor=SteelBlue
|align=center|2016
|align=center|4th
|align=center|4
|align=center|6 	
|align=center|1 	
|align=center|3 	
|align=center|2 	 	
|align=center|7 		
|align=center|12 	
|align=center|6
|align=center|
|align=center|
|align=center|
|align=center bgcolor=lightgreen|Promoted
|-bgcolor=PowderBlue
|align=center|2016–17
|align=center|3rd
|align=center|10
|align=center|32 	 	
|align=center|14 	 	
|align=center|4 	 	
|align=center|14 	 	 	
|align=center|51 	 	
|align=center|35 	 	 		
|align=center|46
|align=center|
|align=center|
|align=center|
|align=center|Renamed to Teplovyk-Prykarpattia Ivano-Frankivsk
|-bgcolor=PowderBlue
|align=center|2017–18
|align=center|3rd
|align=center|2
|align=center|27
|align=center|20 	
|align=center|2		
|align=center|5
|align=center|58	 	 	
|align=center|28	
|align=center|62
|align=center| finals
|align=center|
|align=center|
|align=center bgcolor=lightgreen|Promoted Renamed to Prykarpattia Ivano-Frankivsk
|-bgcolor=LightCyan
|align=center|2018–19
|align=center|2nd
|align=center|10
|align=center|28
|align=center|10
|align=center|4
|align=center|14
|align=center|41
|align=center|39
|align=center|34
|align=center| finals
|align=center|
|align=center|
|align=center|
|-bgcolor=LightCyan
|align=center|2019–20
|align=center|2nd
|align=center|12
|align=center|30 	
|align=center|9 	
|align=center|3 	
|align=center|18 	
|align=center|44 	
|align=center|51 	 
|align=center|30
|align=center| finals
|align=center|
|align=center|
|align=center|
|-bgcolor=LightCyan
|align=center|2020–21
|align=center|2nd
|align=center|14
|align=center|30  
|align=center|8  
|align=center|6 
|align=center|16  
|align=center|25
|align=center|45  
|align=center|30
|align=center| finals
|align=center|
|align=center|
|align=center|
|}

Notes

References

 
Ukrainian First League clubs
Association football clubs established in 1998
1998 establishments in Ukraine
Football clubs in Ivano-Frankivsk
Phoenix clubs (association football)